Lithophane venusta is a moth in the family Noctuidae. It is found in Taiwan, Japan and Nepal.

The wingspan is 36–39 mm.

Subspecies
Lithophane venusta venusta
Lithophane venusta fibigeri Hreblay & Ronkay, 1998 (Nepal)
Lithophane venusta yazakii Yoshimoto, 1988 (Taiwan)

References

Moths described in 1889
venusta
Moths of Japan